The Broxbourne Council election, 2002 was held to elect council members of the Broxbourne Borough Council, the local government authority of the borough of Broxbourne, Hertfordshire, England.

Composition of expiring seats before election

Election results

Results summary 
An election was held in all of the 13 wards on 2 May 2002.

16 council seats were involved with 2 seats being voted for in Goffs Oak Ward and 3 seats in Hoddesdon Town Ward.

Martin Greensmyth won the Bury Green Ward for the Independent "Bury Green Residents"

The new political balance of the council following this election was:

Conservative 35 seats
Labour 2 seats
Independent 1 seat

Ward results

References

2002
2002 English local elections
2000s in Hertfordshire